Saint John's Episcopal Church is a historic church at the northwest corner of Rayburn and Porter Avenue in Ocean Springs, Mississippi.

It was built in 1892. New York architect Manly N. Cutter is credited with its design. It was added to the National Register in 1987.

References

Episcopal church buildings in Mississippi
Queen Anne architecture in Mississippi
Shingle Style architecture in Mississippi
Gothic Revival church buildings in Mississippi
Churches completed in 1892
19th-century Episcopal church buildings
Churches on the National Register of Historic Places in Mississippi
National Register of Historic Places in Jackson County, Mississippi